Under the Covers may refer to:

 Under the Covers (radio program), a Canadian radio program
 Under the Covers: Essential Red Hot Chili Peppers, an album by the Red Hot Chili Peppers
 Under the Covers, Vol. 1, an album by Matthew Sweet and Susanna Hoffs covering songs from the 1960s
 Under the Covers, Vol. 2, an album by Matthew Sweet and Susanna Hoffs covering songs from the 1970s
 Under the Covers, Vol. 3, an album by Matthew Sweet and Susanna Hoffs covering songs from the 1980s
 Under the Covers (Dwight Yoakam album), released in 1997
 Under the Covers (Colton Ford album), released in 2009
 Under the Covers (Ninja Sex Party album), released in 2016
 Under the Covers, Vol. II, an album by Ninja Sex Party, released in 2017
 Under the Covers, Vol. III, an album by Ninja Sex Party, released in 2019
 Under The Covers, an album by Les Fradkin
 Under the Covers, an album by Maddy Prior
 Under the Covers, a cover album by Walk Off The Earth